The NWL Midget Championship was the midget professional wrestling title in the National Wrestling League promotion. It was first won by Hollywood Miles "Vader" Glencoe who defeated Little Salami (with manager Professor Egon Ecton) in 1995. The title was defended primarily in the Mid-Atlantic and East Coast, most often in Hagerstown, Maryland, but also in Pennsylvania and West Virginia until its retirement in 1999. There were 4 recognized known champions with a total of 4 title reigns.

Title history

See also
Midgets' World Championship
NWA World Midget's Championship
WCPW Midget Championship

References

Midget wrestling championships